Ammathottam is a village in the Kumbakonam taluk of Thanjavur district, Tamil Nadu, India.

Demographics 

As per the 2001 census, Ammathottam had a total population of 78 with 39 males and 39 females. The sex ratio was 1000. The literacy rate was 69.44.

References 

 

Villages in Thanjavur district